Llenandose de gusanos is the second full-length studio album by Japanese doom metal band Corrupted. The album comprises two CDs, each containing only one track. The first disc is in the typical doom style Corrupted is known for, while the second disc contains ambience.

The title is Spanish for "Filling of Worms" or "Filling Oneself with Worms", although the technical Spanish translation for "filling oneself" is llenándose, not llenandose; the accent mark was left off the title.

Track listing

Personnel
Jose – bass guitar
Chew Hasegawa – drums
Talbot – guitar
Hevi – vocals
Takehito Miyagi – ambient sounds
Ippei Suda, Ryo Watanabe – mixing
Bravo Yoshida – piano, synthesizer
Ippei Suda, Hara Koichi – recording

Corrupted (band) albums
2004 albums